Raja Permaisuri Agong (Jawi: راج ڤرمايسوري اݢوڠ; full title: Kebawah Duli Yang Maha Mulia Seri Paduka Baginda Raja Permaisuri Agong; سري ڤدوک بݢيندا راج ڤرمايسوري اݢوڠ, literally The Queen of Malaysia) is the title given to the consort of the Yang di-Pertuan Agong, the elected, constitutional federal monarch of Malaysia.

Title
The full style and title in Malay is Kebawah Duli Yang Maha Mulia Seri Paduka Baginda Raja Permaisuri Agong.

Kebawah Duli Yang Maha Mulia literally means Under the dust of the Almighty referring to how the Raja Permaisuri Agong's power and prestige is dust compared to God's power and the ruler and his consort are always subservient to God and never above and beyond God.

Seri Paduka Baginda refers to Seri as in a person. Paduka means victorious and the term Baginda is in Malay for a royal in the third person.

Raja Permaisuri Agong in literal English is "The Supreme Lady Queen". It is an archaic equivalent to Raja where the female is a Raja Permaisuri and "Agong" (or Agung in standard Malay) means "supreme". The term Agong is not translated, as in the Constitution of Malaysia.

Common English terms used in the media and by the general public include "Queen", "Supreme Queen" and "Paramount Consort".

Terminology and precedence
As the title "Yang di-Pertuan Agong" is commonly glossed as "King" in English, the title "Raja Permaisuri Agong" is commonly translated to "Queen", and in English the bearer is thus referred to as "Her Majesty" and addressed as "Your Majesty". The Malay word permaisuri is derived from Sanskrit परमेश्वरी (parameśvarī), 'supreme lady'.

The Raja Permaisuri Agong immediately follows her husband, the Yang di-Pertuan Agong, in the Malaysian order of precedence.

Status, functions, and privileges
The Yang di-Pertuan Agong is elected (de facto rotated) every five years among the nine hereditary rulers of the states of Malaysia. When a ruler is elected as the Yang di-Pertuan Agong, his consort automatically becomes the Raja Permaisuri Agong. In effect, the holder of the title of Raja Permaisuri Agong changes every five years, though it could happen earlier due to the death or resignation of the Yang di-Pertuan Agong.

Like many spouses of heads of state, the Raja Permaisuri Agong has no stipulated role in the Constitution of Malaysia. She accompanies the Yang di-Pertuan Agong to official functions and state visits, as well as hosting visiting heads of state and their spouses. Article 34 of the Malaysian Constitution forbids the Raja Permaisuri Agong from holding any appointment, carrying any remuneration, or actively engaging in any commercial enterprise. The Raja Permaisuri Agong is, however, legally entitled to an annual payment which is included in the Civil List of the Yang di-Pertuan Agong.

Previous holders of the title of Raja Permaisuri Agong whose husbands are deceased receive a pension from the Federal Government's Civil List. They also take precedence immediately after the reigning Yang di-Pertuan Agong, the current Raja Permaisuri Agong, the reigning monarchs of royal states, and the Yang di-Pertua Negeri of non-royal states.

List of Raja Permaisuri Agong
The following consorts have served as Raja Permaisuri Agong:

1. Tuanku Abdul Halim was the first and only Yang di-Pertuan Agong to reign twice. Sultanah Haminah was his second wife from 1975 to his death and reigned alongside him as Raja Permaisuri Agong XIV as Sultanah Bahiyah had passed away in 2003.
2. Sultan Muhammad V reigned without a queen consort as his wife Sultanah Nur Diana Petra was not proclaimed as Sultanah of Kelantan until 2022. Shortly before his abdication in January 2019, it was reported that Muhammad V had married Oksana Voevodina, however the marriage was not officially acknowledged and Voevodina was not recognized as his consort.

List of Raja Permaisuri Agong by age 
Tunku Najihah is the eldest living former Raja Permaisuri Agong and she also holds the distinction as the longest lived Raja Permaisuri Agong since 24 May 2008 when she surpassed the age of Tunku Kurshiah who died on 2 February 1999 at the age of 87 years and 262 days.

References

See also
 Yang di-Pertuan Agong — consort's spouse + monarch−ruler of Malaysia.
 Elective monarchy
 Royal Regalia of Malaysia
 Yang di-Pertuan Negara — national Malaysian award for elected monarchs.
 Malay titles — on Peninsular Malaysia and Borneo within Brunei + Malaysia.

 
Malaysian women by role
.
Noble titles of Malaysia
Malaysian monarchy
Malaysian nobility
Malaysia
Women in Malaysia
1957 establishments in Malaya
1957 introductions